Mochau is a former municipality in the district of Mittelsachsen, in Saxony, Germany. Since 1 January 2016 it is part of the town Döbeln.

References 

Döbeln
Former municipalities in Saxony